Georges Trombert (10 August 1874 – 27 February 1949) was a French fencer. He won two silver medals and a bronze at the 1920 Summer Olympics.

References

External links
 

1874 births
1949 deaths
French male épée fencers
Olympic fencers of France
Fencers at the 1920 Summer Olympics
Olympic silver medalists for France
Olympic bronze medalists for France
Olympic medalists in fencing
Sportspeople from Geneva
Medalists at the 1920 Summer Olympics
French male foil fencers
French male sabre fencers
20th-century French people